Minbyun (민변,民辯) is a South Korean social organization of progressive lawyers. The name "Minbyun" is the abbreviation of "Minjusahoereul wihan Byeonhosamoim (민주사회를 위한 변호사모임, 民主社會를 爲한 辯護士모임)", translated as "Lawyers for a Democratic Society" in English. Since the foundation in 1988, one year after the collapse of military government, member lawyers have engaged in activities for preserving human rights and democracy. Many famous human rights attorneys have been members, and some of them have grown into popular politicians including Roh Moo-hyun, the 16th president of South Korea, Park Won-soon, 35th·36th·37th Mayor of Seoul, and Moon Jae-in, 19th President of South Korea.

References

External links
 Official website
(English) Official English-language blog

Legal organizations based in South Korea
Liberal organizations
Liberalism in South Korea